The Shanghai Trophy is an annual international skating competition organized by the Chinese Skating Association. Invited skaters compete in the disciplines of short track speed skating, synchronized skating, or figure skating. The first event was held in 2016.

Events offered

Medalists

Figure skating

Men

Ladies

Pairs

Ice dance

Synchronized skating

References

External links
2019 Shanghai Trophy Announcement
 Short track speed skating
 Figure skating
 Synchronized skating

Short track speed skating competitions
Figure skating competitions
Synchronized skating competitions
International speed skating competitions hosted by China
International figure skating competitions hosted by China